Jim Knowles was a football manager. He managed Tranmere Rovers from 1936-1939.

Management career

Former film extra Knowles became secretary and manager of Tranmere Rovers in 1936. He masterminded Rovers’ triumphant championship season in 1937-38, when five points from their three final games clinched promotion from Division Three North to a first ever season in Division Two. It is still Rovers' sole championship in the Football League. However, they were relegated the next season having won just six of 42 matches – the all-time worst record of any team in Division Two.

Knowles left the club in 1939, at the start of World War II.

References

External links

Tranmere Rovers F.C. managers
Year of birth missing
Year of death missing
English football managers